The designation Dodge SRT-10 can refer to three vehicles, all of them powered by Dodge's V10 engine:

Dodge Viper SRT-10
Dodge Ram SRT-10
Dodge Tomahawk SRT-10